Nätschen railway station is a railway station in the municipality of Andermatt, in the Swiss canton of Uri. It is an intermediate stop on the  gauge Furka Oberalp line of the Matterhorn Gotthard Bahn. It serves the mountain location and ski area of Nätschen.

Services 
The following services stop at Nätschen:

References

External links 
 
 

Railway stations in the canton of Uri
Matterhorn Gotthard Bahn stations
Andermatt